Igor Jelavić (born 1962) is a retired Croatian football player who played for HNK Rijeka, Hajduk Split, NK Zagreb, NK Split and NK Solin.

Personal life
He is Mario Jelavić's father and Ivan Perišić's uncle.

References

External links
 at vecernji.hr.
 at forum.b92

 article at sportmagazine.levif.be

1962 births
Living people
Footballers from Split, Croatia
Association football defenders
Yugoslav footballers
Croatian footballers
NK Solin players
RNK Split players
HNK Rijeka players
HNK Hajduk Split players
Union Royale Namur Fosses-La-Ville players
NK Zagreb players
VfB Wissen players
Yugoslav First League players
Yugoslav expatriate footballers
Expatriate footballers in Belgium
Yugoslav expatriate sportspeople in Belgium
Croatian expatriate footballers
Expatriate footballers in Germany
Croatian expatriate sportspeople in Germany